Angus Redford Sutherland (born September 3, 1982) is an American-Canadian actor and producer.

Biography 
Angus Sutherland is the third son of actor Donald Sutherland and Francine Racette. He is the younger brother to Roeg and Rossif Sutherland, and half-brother Kiefer Sutherland and his twin sister, Rachel.

His father Donald Sutherland gave him the middle name Redford in honor of Robert Redford, who had directed him in Ordinary People.

Filmography 
Familiar Strangers (2008)
Harold & Kumar Escape from Guantanamo Bay (2008)
Lost Boys: The Tribe (2008)
Undefeated (2011)
Foo Fighters: Back and Forth (2011)
Tiebreaker (2015)
November Criminals (2016)
Kidnap (2017)
1917 (2019)

Television work 
Commander in Chief (2005)
Dollhouse (2009)

References

External links 
 
 http://www.newrepublicpictures.com
 https://pro-labs.imdb.com/name/nm1947975/

1982 births
Living people
21st-century American male actors
American male film actors
American male television actors
Canadian male film actors
Canadian male television actors
French Quebecers
Male actors from Los Angeles
Angus